These are the official results of the Women's 5000 metres event at the 2001 IAAF World Championships in Edmonton, Canada.

Olga Yegorova had tested positive for EPO earlier in 2001 which drew protests from her fellow competitors after she was allowed to compete in the World Athletics Championships. Although her urine sample tested positive for EPO, the French authorities failed to take an accompanying blood test and she avoided a suspension on a technicality.

Medalists

Results

Heats
Qualification: First 5 in each heat (Q) and the next 5 fastest (q) advanced to the final.

Final

References

 Finals Results
 Heats results

5000
5000 metres at the World Athletics Championships
2001 in women's athletics